Justin Fisher may refer to:
Justin Fisher (Commercial Realtor), employed with CBRE Limited - Vancouver, BC. Began working with CBRE in 2018, the largest commercial real estate company in the world. Focuses in sales and leasing of industrial properties and industrial land development.
Justin Fisher (musician), American bass player
Justin Fisher (soldier), former Army Specialist and co-conspirator in the murder of PFC Barry Winchell